This list of Indonesian architects includes notable architects, civil engineers, and other historic figures from the archipelago of Indonesia and its history. Also included are those who were born outside Indonesia but are primarily known for their practice within Indonesia.

Ancient period

Dang Hyang Nirartha
Gunadharma

Early modern period

Albert Aalbers 
A.W. Gmelig Weyning
Cosman Citroen
Frans Ghijsels 
G.J.P.M. Bolsius
Han Groenewegen
H. von Essen
Henri Maclaine Pont 
J. Gerber
J.F.L. Blankenberg
K. Bos
Liem Bwan Tjie
M.J. Hulswit
Pieter Moojen 
Soejoedi Wirjoatmodjo
Sukarno
Thomas Karsten 
Wolff Schoemaker

Contemporary to present

Han Awal
Yori Antar
Andra Matin
Adi Purnomo
Daliana Suryawinata & Florian Heinzelmann
Danny Wicaksono
Sonny Sutanto
Budi Pradono
Ahmad & Wendy Djuhara
Achmad Noerzaman
Ardi Jahya
Tiyok Prasetyoadi
Gatot Surarjo
Eko Prawoto
Irianto PH
Yanto Effendi
Sardjono Sani
Sukendro Prioso & Jeffry Sandy
Denny Gondo
Supie Yolodi & Maria Rosantina
Hendy & Patrick Lim
Zenin Adrian
Ridwan Kamil
Achmad D Tardiyana
Oki Kuspriyanto
Muhammad Thamrin
Willis Kusuma
Andy Rahman
Endy Subijono
Baskoro Tedjo
Bambang Eryudhawan
Gunawan Tjahjono
Yu Sing
Y. B. Mangunwijaya
Friedrich Silaban
Raynaldo Timothy Irwantoro

References

External links
Architects who worked in Dutch colonies

See also
Architecture of Indonesia
List of architects

Indonesia